The Tooth may refer to:

The Tooth (Antarctica), on Ross Island
The Tooth (Washington), USA

See also
Tooth (disambiguation)